Zlatibor is a town located at the namesake mountain in the municipality of Čajetina, western Serbia. As of 2011, the population of the town is 2,821 inhabitants.

It is a popular tourist resort in Serbia. By road and rail it is connected with Užice and Nova Varoš. It lies on the road linking Belgrade with the Montenegrin coast and off the Belgrade–Bar railway.

History
The town's original name was Kulaševac. In August 1893, King Aleksandar Obrenović came to Kulaševac, and built a fountain called Kraljeva česma (Краљева чесма, "The King's Fountain"). In honor of King Aleksandar's contribution, Kulaševac was renamed to Kraljeva Voda (Краљева Вода, "The King's Water"). In 1903, King Petar Karađorđević I built a villa on the site, helping strengthen the growing trend of turning the slopes surrounding Kraljeva Voda into a vacation spot. After World War II, Kraljeva Voda was renamed to Partizanske Vode (Партизанске Воде, "The Partisans' Waters") in 1946. The name change was out of respect for wounded Zlatibor Partisans who were murdered by Nazi Germany's army in November and December 1941, while they were recovering in the main hospital of Palisad in the northern part of Kraljeva Voda. In 1995, Partizanske Vode was renamed to Zlatibor, recognizing the mountain upon which the town rests.

The town lies roughly 10 kilometers from Tornik, a mountain summit popular with skiing enthusiasts.

See also
Cities and towns in Serbia
Populated places of Serbia

References

Populated places in Zlatibor District